Nyctimystes tyleri is a species of frog in the subfamily Pelodryadinae of the family Hylidae. It is endemic to Papua New Guinea and only known from its type locality, Gapaia Creek, between Garaina and Saureli, in the Morobe Province. The specific name honours Michael J. Tyler, an Australian herpetologist, "in recognition of his notable contributions to the systematics of Australo-papuan frogs." Common name Tyler's big-eyed treefrog has been coined for this species.

Description
The holotype, an adult male, measures  in snout–vent length. All dorsal surfaces, apart from the top of thigh, are very warty. Dorsal ground colour is dark green. There are somewhat inconspicuous, large, dark brown blotches on the back. Ventral surfaces are grey with small, dark brown spots on the chin, chest, and abdomen. Legs have larger spots of the same colour. Iris is golden. Tympanum is small and indistinct. Vocal sac is absent.

Habitat and conservation
The locality has an unusually high diversity of stream-associated hylid frogs and is also the type locality for Nyctimystes trachydermis. The locality is remote and probably safe from most threats.

References

tyleri
Amphibians of Papua New Guinea
Amphibians of New Guinea
Endemic fauna of Papua New Guinea
Endemic fauna of New Guinea
Amphibians described in 1983
Taxa named by Richard G. Zweifel
Taxonomy articles created by Polbot